Samara Wijesinghe (21 August 1943 – 4 September 2015)  was a Sri Lanka engineer, author, poet and blogger.

Biography
Wijesinghelage Samarasena Wijesinghe was born in Kegalle, Sri Lanka. He completed his education at Government Science College, Matale and embarked on his first job as a mechanical engineer at the National Steel Corporation. He later moved to Lanka Walltiles PLC before embarking on his own plywood production house.

Publications

Samara was a prolific poet in Sinhalese with many publications in both print and electronic media to his name. A short summary includes the following:

චූල ගායිකාව (short stories) 2003
ගෝත්‍රිකාව (short stories) 2004
නොසිදුවීම් කීපයක් (short stories) 2005
එක කවිය සිය වරක් (poetry) 2009
සේදී ගිය පාට (short stories)2009
සද්ධර්ම කතා- සද්ධර්මරත්නාවලියේ එන කෙටිකතා කීපයක් (short stories - Retold stories from Saddharma Rathanawaliya) 2010

Presence in Electronic Media

Wijesinghe maintained a blog titled 'නොසිදුවීම් කීපයක්' (Non-Events). The collected short stories from this were subsequently published as a book by the same name. He was a vocal presence in the Sinhalese blog-sphere, encouraging other bloggers to write and publish their work. As the first collection of online writings he led the popular Sinhalese website Boondi.lk to publish Boondi Akshara Senaga (බූන්දි අක්ෂර සෙනග).

References

2015 deaths
Sinhalese writers
1943 births